Naktala is a neighbourhood in South Kolkata in West Bengal, India. It is bounded by Ganguly Bagan to the north, Bansdroni to the west, Garia Crossing to the south and Baishnabghata Patuli to the east.

History 
Previously forest, swampland and a peaceful rural area, dotted with ponds and the occasional dak bungalow (the erstwhile Dalgis bungalow) in between, Naktala is located by the Tolly's Nullah (Adi Ganga canal) connecting Kolkata to the Vidhyadhari River to the east. It has evolved with time from a sleepy to a bustling neighbourhood, burgeoned and prospered with the arrival of people from all over, mainly East Bengal after independence. The name is supposed to have originated from Nagtala (Nag meaning Snake, a place of snakes) according to one source and from Nak meaning Swarga (Heaven).

Presently 
Naktala is an upmarket suburban area of Kolkata in the southern part of the city, in the vicinity of Tollygunge and Garia. Netaji Subhash Chandra Bose Road connecting these two places, divides Naktala into two parts. Single and multi-storied houses are slowly giving way to multi-storied apartments, all over the area.

Transport 
Naktala is connected by road and metro railway to the other parts of Kolkata. Many buses like AC Bus (AC6), CSTC Buses (S6A, S7), Private Buses (80A, 228, SD5), Naktala - Howrah Mini Bus, Harinavi - Howrah Mini Bus etc. ply on Netaji Subhash Chandra Bose Road (NSC Bose Road). The closest metro station is Gitanjali.

Nearby 
Naktala is close to Dhakuria (4 km), Jadavpur (2 km), Garia (1.8 km), Purba Putiary (2.5 km), Panchasayar (2.5 km), Tollygunge (3.0 km), Kasba (3.3 km).

Education 
Naktala is rich in schools, with colleges mostly in Garia, Netaji Nagar and elsewhere.
The schools are :
 Mukul Bose Memorial Institution
 Ananda Ashram Balika Vidyapith
 Maharishi Vidya Mandir
 Bani Bhavan High School
 Shri R K Ananda Ashram Girls School
 Khanpur Girls High School
 All Saints Academy
 Naktala High School
 B.D. Memorial School, Bansdroni

Notable persons 
Abdur Razzak, Bangladeshi actor
Sukumar Samajpati, footballer
Damayanti Sen, IPS 
Kabir Suman, singer and former Member of Parliament
Ustad Rashid Khan, Hindusthani Classical Vocalist
Krishanu Dey, footballer
Tapas Sen, acclaimed stage lighting designer
Gautam Chattopadhyay, Moheener Ghoraguli
Binayak Bandopadhyay, writer, poet

Shrines 
The Shiva Temple, on NSC Bose Road, the Shitala Temple, Yogomaya Kali Mandir, and also the Sri Guru Ashram (Durga Prashanna Paramahansha Road) and elsewhere.

Festivals 
Durga Puja is celebrated at Naktala with great pomp. Other festivals include the Old Rath Jatra fair at Rathtala and local fairs round the year.
The much acclaimed and award-winning Udayan Sangha Durga Puja celebrated in the Udayan Sangha grounds adds to the pride of Naktala.

Medicare 
Naktala has several nursing homes and hospitals.

 Acharya Durga Prasanna Paramahamsa Sebayatan
 BC Roy Polio Clinic and Hospital for Crippled Children
 Sevangan Medical Complex
 Nidan Poly Clinic
 Springdale Health Care Unit

Climate 
The climate is tropical. The hallmark is the monsoon season, from early June to mid September. The weather remains dry during the winter (mid November to mid February) and humid during summer.

See also 
 Kolkata Metro Railway Routes (North South Corridor)

References

External links 
 Naktala at Google Maps
 Naktala at mapsofindia.com
 Official site of KMC
  Urban Rail
 Naktala Udayan Sangha

Neighbourhoods in Kolkata